King Parrot are an Australian grindcore band formed in Melbourne in 2010. They have released three studio albums: Bite Your Head Off (2012), Dead Set (2015) and Ugly Produce (2017).

History
King Parrot formed in Melbourne in 2010 with the original line-up of Matt Young (vocals), Ed Lacey and Ari White (guitar), Slatts Everday (bass) and drummer Matt Rizzo. White, Rizzo and Lacey had come directly from their previous band Watchdog Discipline, Slatts Everyday was a member of Warrnambool rock band Cockfight Shootout. Lacey had also been a member of The Berzerker for several years and Rizzo was formerly with Blood Duster.

After the release of The Stench of Hardcore Pub Trash EP in 2011, Lacey left King Parrot and was replaced by Andrew Livingstone-Squires, formerly of Dreadnaught and Cemetery Urn. The group recorded and independently released their debut full-length album Bite Your Head Off in 2012, which was picked up by UK based metal label Candlelight Records in 2013 for worldwide release. Shortly after the album's release Rizzo was replaced by Matt "Skitz" Sanders, formerly of Damaged but the band's heavy touring schedule meant he was replaced on overseas dates by Rob Brens of Alarum. King Parrot had by now established themselves as intense live act, and their unsettling sense of humour, most notably in their music video "Shit on the Liver", which was a finalist in the 2013 Australian Music Video Awards.

After extensive touring within Australia, supporting Obituary, Carcass and Thy Art Is Murder, King Parrot were invited to play a number of prominent music festivals including an appearance at the 2013 Hammersonic Jakarta International Metal Festival in Indonesia, Australia's Soundwave Festival and the 2014 SXSW in Austin, Texas, which was part of a 45-date North American tour. They later signed a management deal with Extreme Management Group in New York.  Pantera and Down vocalist Phil Anselmo personally interviewed them on his Housecore Records YouTube channel.

In June 2014, at the end of their Australian tour with Carcass, it was announced that Todd Hansen, formerly of The Berzerker and Headkase, would be taking over from Sanders. In late 2014 King Parrot recorded their second album Dead Set at Anselmo's studio in Louisiana. It was released in May 2015 and peaked on the Australian albums chart at #21. Dead Set was nominated for an ARIA Award for Best Hard Rock or Heavy Metal Album that year but lost to Northlane's Node.

King Parrot toured Australia with Psycroptic and Revocation in early 2017, following which the band recorded their third album in Melbourne. Ugly Produce was released on 22 September and reached #21 on the ARIA chart. During October, the band toured the US with Superjoint and DevilDriver.

Members

Current
 Matthew "Youngy" Young – lead vocals (2010–present)
 Ari "Mr. White" White – guitars (2010–present)
 Slatts Everyday – bass, backing vocals (2010–present)
 Andrew "Squiz" Livingstone-Squires – guitars (2012–present)
 Todd "Toddy" Hansen – drums (2014–present)

Former
 Ed Lacey – guitars (2010–2012)
 Mat Rizzo – drums (2010–2012)
 Matt "Skitz" Sanders – drums (2012–2014)

Discography

Studio albums

Extended Plays

Awards and nominations

ARIA Music Awards
The ARIA Music Awards are a set of annual ceremonies presented by Australian Recording Industry Association (ARIA), which recognise excellence, innovation, and achievement across all genres of the music of Australia. They commenced in 1987. 

! 
|-
| 2015 || Dead Set||rowspan="2"| ARIA Award for Best Hard Rock or Heavy Metal Album ||  ||rowspan="2"|
|-
| 2018 || Ugly Produce ||

Metal Hammer Golden Gods Awards

|-
| 2015 || King Parrot || Best New Band ||

Music Victoria Awards
The Music Victoria Awards are an annual awards night celebrating Victorian music. They commenced in 2006.

! 
|-
| Music Victoria Awards of 2013
| Bite Your Head Off
| Best Heavy Album
| 
|rowspan="4"|
|-
| Music Victoria Awards of 2014
| King Parrot
| Best Live Band
| 
|-
| Music Victoria Awards of 2015
| Dead Set
| Best Heavy Album
| 
|-
| Music Victoria Awards of 2016
| King Parrot
| Best Live Band
| 
|-
|}

References

External links

Australian hardcore punk groups
Deathwish Inc. artists
Musical groups established in 2010
Musical groups from Melbourne
Musical quintets
2010 establishments in Australia